Chikasanoxee Creek is a stream in Chambers and Randolph counties, Alabama. It is a tributary of the Tallapoosa River. The stream begins in extreme southern Randolph County just south of Roanoke, Al. The stream meanders roughly 16 miles through northern Chambers County. The creek flows just to the northwest of Five Points, AL then through the following communities of Mt. Hickory, Milltown and Levertt's Mills. The creek eventually empties into the Tallapoosa River in northwestern Chambers Co. near Muleshoe Bend.

Chikasanoxee is a name likely derived from the Muscogee language meaning "cane ridge".

Features

References

Bodies of water of Chambers County, Alabama
Bodies of water of Randolph County, Alabama
Rivers of Alabama
Alabama placenames of Native American origin